AF Luftëtari, commonly known as Luftëtari is a football club based in Gjirokastër, southern Albania. The club plays in the Kategoria e Dytë, which is the third tier of football in the country.

History
After the dissolution of KF Luftëtari due to debts, the Gjirokastra Municipality in December 2020 set in motion to establish a new club as successor of the KF Luftëtari, and at the beginning of February 2021 all the criteria set by the Albanian Football Association for the functioning of the team were met and the name of the team and the logo were revealed which would again stand with the blue and black colors, exactly those characteristic of KF Luftëtari in 91 years of history.

Players

Current squad

Honours

League titles
 Kategoria e Tretë
 Winners (1): 2021

References

Association football clubs established in 2020
AF Luftëtari
2020 establishments in Albania
Gjirokastër
Albanian Third Division clubs
Kategoria e Dytë clubs